Sonoran University of Health Sciences, formerly Southwest College of Naturopathic Medicine, is a private naturopathic medical school in Tempe, Arizona. Founded in 1993, Sonoran University is one of seven accredited naturopathic medical schools in North America.

Academics
The Doctor of Naturopathic Medicine Program at Sonoran University of Health Sciences follows a prescribed curriculum set by the Council on Naturopathic Medical Education (CNME). Quarters at Sonoran University are designated as fall, winter, spring, and summer. If students adhere to the curriculum they can graduate after 14 consecutive quarters, or four calendar years.

Sonoran University of Health Sciences is accredited by the Higher Learning Commission.

Extended clinic sites
 Arizona Pathways: Substance Abuse Rehabilitation
 Hamilton Elementary School Clinic: Pediatrics/Family Care for the Underprivileged
 Mission of Mercy: Medical Mobile Unit/Family Practice for Uninsured
 The River Source : Holistic treatment center for substance abuse rehabilitation
 Southwest Center for HIV/AIDS: HIV/AIDS, Infectious Disease
 Sojourner: Women’s and Children’s Domestic Violence Shelter
 WAHI Center: Substance Abuse Rehabilitation

References

External links
Official website

Educational institutions established in 1993
1993 establishments in Arizona
Naturopathic medical schools accredited by the Council on Naturopathic Medical Education
Private universities and colleges in Arizona